Regent's Park is a ward in the London Borough of Camden, in the United Kingdom. The ward has existed since the creation of the borough on 1 April 1965 and was first used in the 1964 elections. The ward was redrawn in May 1978 and May 2002. In 2018, the ward had an electorate of 8,959. The Boundary Commission projects the electorate to reduce to 8,830 by 2025.

Election results

Elections in the 2020s

References

Wards of the London Borough of Camden
1965 establishments in England